GS4 may refer to

Samsung Galaxy S4, a 2013 smart phone
Gyakuten Saiban 4, a 2007 video game
Southern Pacific class GS-4